In the mathematical area of graph theory, Kőnig's theorem, proved by , describes an equivalence between the maximum matching problem and the minimum vertex cover problem in bipartite graphs. It was discovered independently, also in 1931, by Jenő Egerváry in the more general case of weighted graphs.

Setting 
A vertex cover in a graph is a set of vertices that includes at least one endpoint of every edge, and a vertex cover is minimum if no other vertex cover has fewer vertices. A matching in a graph is a set of edges no two of which share an endpoint, and a matching is maximum if no other matching has more edges.

It is obvious from the definition that any vertex-cover set must be at least as large as any matching set (since for every edge in the matching, at least one vertex is needed in the cover). In particular, the minimum vertex cover set is at least as large as the maximum matching set. Kőnig's theorem states that, in any bipartite graph, the minimum vertex cover set and the maximum matching set have in fact the same size.

Statement of the theorem 
In any bipartite graph, the number of edges in a maximum matching equals the number of vertices in a minimum vertex cover.

Example 
The bipartite graph shown in the above illustration has 14 vertices; a matching with six edges is shown in blue, and a vertex cover with six vertices is shown in red. There can be no smaller vertex cover, because any vertex cover has to include at least one endpoint of each matched edge (as well as of every other edge), so this is a minimum vertex cover. Similarly, there can be no larger matching, because any matched edge has to include at least one endpoint in the vertex cover, so this is a maximum matching. Kőnig's theorem states that the equality between the sizes of the matching and the cover (in this example, both numbers are six) applies more generally to any bipartite graph.

Proofs

Constructive proof 

The following proof provides a way of constructing a minimum vertex cover from a maximum matching. Let  be a bipartite graph and let  be the two parts of the vertex set .

Let  be a minimum cut.

Constructive proof without flow concepts 

Let

Alternatively, if  is unmatched but not in an alternating path, then its left endpoint cannot be in an alternating path, for such a path could be extended by adding  to it. Thus,  forms a vertex cover.

And every vertex in  must also be matched, for if there existed an alternating path to an unmatched vertex then changing the matching by removing the matched edges from this path and adding the unmatched edges in their place would increase the size of the matching.

Proof using linear programming duality 
To explain this proof, we first have to extend the notion of a matching to that of a fractional matching - an assignment of a weight in [0,1] to each edge, such that the sum of weights near each vertex is at most 1 (an integral matching is a special case of a fractional matching in which the weights are in {0,1}).  Similarly we define a fractional vertex-cover - an assignment of a non-negative weight to each vertex, such that the sum of weights in each edge is at least 1 (an integral vertex-cover is a special case of a fractional vertex-cover in which the weights are in {0,1}).

The maximum fractional matching size in a graph  is the solution of the following linear program:Maximize      1E · x

Subject to:     x ≥ 0E

__  AG · x  ≤  1V.where x is a vector of size |E| in which each element represents the weight of an edge in the fractional matching.  1E is a vector of |E| ones, so the first line indicates the size of the matching. 0E is a vector of |E| zeros, so the second line indicates the constraint that the weights are non-negative. 1V is a vector of |V| ones and AG is the incidence matrix of G, so the third line indicates the constraint that the sum of weights near each vertex is at most 1.

Subject to:     y ≥ 0V

__  AGT · y  ≥  1E.where y is a vector of size |V| in which each element represents the weight of a vertex in the fractional cover. Here, the first line is the size of the cover, the second line represents the non-negativity of the weights, and the third line represents the requirement that the sum of weights near each edge must be at least 1.

Now, the minimum fractional cover LP is exactly the dual linear program of the maximum fractional matching LP. Therefore, by the LP duality theorem, both programs have the same solution. This fact is true not only in bipartite graphs but in arbitrary graphs:In any graph, the largest size of a fractional matching equals the smallest size of a fractional vertex cover.What makes bipartite graphs special is that, in bipartite graphs, both these linear programs have optimal solutions in which all variable values are integers. This follows from the fact that in the fractional matching polytope of a bipartite graph, all extreme points have only integer coordinates, and the same is true for the fractional vertex-cover polytope. Therefore the above theorem implies:
In any bipartite graph, the largest size of a matching equals the smallest size of a vertex cover.

Algorithm
The constructive proof described above provides an algorithm for producing a minimum vertex cover given a maximum matching.  Thus, the Hopcroft–Karp algorithm for finding maximum matchings in bipartite graphs may also be used to solve the vertex cover problem efficiently in these graphs.

Despite the equivalence of the two problems from the point of view of exact solutions, they are not equivalent for approximation algorithms. Bipartite maximum matchings can be approximated arbitrarily accurately in constant time by distributed algorithms; in contrast, approximating the minimum vertex cover of a bipartite graph requires at least logarithmic time.

Example
From left to right label the vertices in the bottom layer with the numbers 1, …, 7 and label the vertices in the top layer with the numbers 8, …, 14.

Non-bipartite graphs 
For graphs that are not bipartite, the minimum vertex cover may be larger than the maximum matching. Moreover, the two problems are very different in complexity: maximum matchings can be found in polynomial time for any graph, while minimum vertex cover is NP-complete.

The complement of a vertex cover in any graph is an independent set, so a minimum vertex cover is complementary to a maximum independent set; finding maximum independent sets is another NP-complete problem. The equivalence between matching and covering articulated in Kőnig's theorem allows minimum vertex covers and maximum independent sets to be computed in polynomial time for bipartite graphs, despite the NP-completeness of these problems for more general graph families.

History 
Kőnig's theorem is named after the Hungarian mathematician Dénes Kőnig. Kőnig had announced in 1914 and published in 1916 the results that every regular bipartite graph has a perfect matching, and more generally that the chromatic index of any bipartite graph (that is, the minimum number of matchings into which it can be partitioned) equals its maximum degree – the latter statement is known as Kőnig's line coloring theorem. However,  attribute Kőnig's theorem itself to a later paper of Kőnig (1931).

In Hungarian, Kőnig's name has a double acute accent, but his theorem is sometimes spelled (incorrectly) in German characters, with an umlaut.

Related theorems 
Kőnig's theorem is equivalent to many other min-max theorems in graph theory and combinatorics, such as Hall's marriage theorem and Dilworth's theorem. Since bipartite matching is a special case of maximum flow, the theorem also results from the max-flow min-cut theorem.

Connections with perfect graphs 
A graph is said to be perfect if, in every induced subgraph, the chromatic number equals the size of the largest clique. Any bipartite graph is perfect, because each of its subgraphs is either bipartite or independent; in a bipartite graph that is not independent the chromatic number and the size of the largest clique are both two while in an independent set the chromatic number and clique number are both one.

A graph is perfect if and only if its complement is perfect, and Kőnig's theorem can be seen as equivalent to the statement that the complement of a bipartite graph is perfect. For, each color class in a coloring of the complement of a bipartite graph is of size at most 2 and the classes of size 2 form a matching, a clique in the complement of a graph G is an independent set in G, and as we have already described an independent set in a bipartite graph G is a complement of a vertex cover in G. Thus, any matching M in a bipartite graph G with n vertices corresponds to a coloring of the complement of G with n-|M| colors, which by the perfection of complements of bipartite graphs corresponds to an independent set in G with n-|M| vertices, which corresponds to a vertex cover of G with M vertices.

One can also connect Kőnig's line coloring theorem to a different class of perfect graphs, the line graphs of bipartite graphs. If G is a graph, the line graph L(G) has a vertex for each edge of G, and an edge for each pair of adjacent edges in G. Thus, the chromatic number of L(G) equals the chromatic index of G.  If G is bipartite, the cliques in L(G) are exactly the sets of edges in G sharing a common endpoint. Now Kőnig's line coloring theorem, stating that the chromatic index equals the maximum vertex degree in any bipartite graph, can be interpreted as stating that the line graph of a bipartite graph is perfect.

Since line graphs of bipartite graphs are perfect, the complements of line graphs of bipartite graphs are also perfect. A clique in the complement of the line graph of G is just a matching in G. And a coloring in the complement of the line graph of G, when G is bipartite, is a partition of the edges of G into subsets of edges sharing a common endpoint; the endpoints shared by each of these subsets form a vertex cover for G. Therefore, Kőnig's theorem itself can also be interpreted as stating that the complements of line graphs of bipartite graphs are perfect.

Weighted variants 
Konig's theorem can be extended to weighted graphs.

Egerváry's theorem for edge-weighted graphs 
Jenő Egerváry (1931) considered graphs in which each edge e has a non-negative integer weight we. The weight vector is denoted by w. The w-weight of a matching is the sum of weights of the edges participating in the matching. A w-vertex-cover is a multiset of vertices ("multiset" means that each vertex may appear several times), in which each edge e is adjacent to at least we vertices. Egerváry's theorem says:In any edge-weighted bipartite graph, the maximum w-weight of a matching equals the smallest number of vertices in a w-vertex-cover.The maximum w-weight of a fractional matching is given by the LP:
Maximize      w · x

Subject to:     x ≥ 0E

__  AG · x  ≤  1V.And the minimum number of vertices in a fractional w-vertex-cover is given by the dual LP:Minimize      1V · y

Subject to:     y ≥ 0V

__  AGT · y  ≥  w.As in the proof of Konig's theorem, the LP duality theorem implies that the optimal values are equal (for any graph), and the fact that the graph is bipartite implies that these programs have optimal solutions in which all values are integers.

Theorem for vertex-weighted graphs 
One can consider a graph in which each vertex v has a non-negative integer weight bv. The weight vector is denoted by b. The b-weight of a vertex-cover is the sum of bv for all v in the cover. A b-matching is an assignment of a non-negative integral weight to each edge, such that the sum of weights of edges adjacent to any vertex v is at most bv. Egerváry's theorem can be extended, using a similar argument, to graphs that have both edge-weights w and vertex-weights b:
In any edge-weighted vertex-weighted bipartite graph, the maximum w-weight of a b-matching equals the minimum b-weight of vertices in a w-vertex-cover.

See also 

 Kőnig's property in hypergraphs

Notes

References 
.

.
.
.

.
.
.
.

.

Theorems in graph theory
Articles containing proofs
Perfect graphs
Matching (graph theory)
Bipartite graphs